Alquyruq (also Romanized as Ālqūyrūq) is a village in Dizaj Rural District, in the Central District of Khoy County, West Azerbaijan Province, Iran. In 2006, its population was 158, with 35 families.

References 

Populated places in Khoy County